Mand Dhaliwal  is a village in Kapurthala district of Punjab State, India.

Demography 
According to the report published by Census India in 2011, Mand Dhaliwal has 1 house with the total population of 6 persons of which 4 are male and 2 females. Literacy rate of  Mand Dhaliwal is 83.33%, higher than the state average of 75.84%.  The population of children in the age group 0–6 years is 0 which is 0.00% of the total population. Child sex ratio is 0, lower than the state average of 846.

Population data

References

External links
  Villages in Kapurthala
 Kapurthala Villages List

Villages in Kapurthala district